Stade du Rhône is an athletics stadium located in the Parc de Parilly in the commune of Vénissieux in Lyon, France.

History
The Stadium was initially built as the Parilly Stadium, but was renamed Stade du Rhône in 2012 after a major renovation in preparation for the 2013 IPC Athletics World Championships. The new development was inaugurated on 3 September 2012 and the main grandstand was named Tribune Tony Bertrand.

Notes

2012 establishments in France
Athletics (track and field) venues in France
Sports venues completed in 2012
Sports venues in Lyon Metropolis
21st-century architecture in France